Thomas Dalyell (1615–1685), Tam Dalyell of the Binns, was a Scottish general.

Thomas Dalyell may also refer to:

 Tam Dalyell (1932–2017), British politician
 Sir Thomas Dalyell of the Binns, 2nd Baronet (died 1719), of the Dalyell baronets

See also 
 Thomas Dalziel (1823–1906), illustrator of the works of Charles Dickens.
 Thomas Kennedy Dalziel, Scottish surgeon and pathologist